Li Jie (born March 24, 1983 in Qingdao) is a female Chinese butterfly swimmer who competed in the 2004 Summer Olympics.

She finished 16th in the 200 metre butterfly event after being eliminated in the semifinals.

External links
 profile 

1983 births
Living people
Olympic swimmers of China
Swimmers at the 2004 Summer Olympics
Swimmers from Qingdao
Swimmers at the 2002 Asian Games
Asian Games competitors for China
Chinese female butterfly swimmers
21st-century Chinese women